The 2016 Giro d'Italia Femminile or Giro Rosa was the 27th running of the Giro d'Italia Femminile, the only remaining women's Grand Tour and the most prestigious stage race on the 2016 UCI Women's World Tour and on the women's calendar.

Competing teams

Pre race favourites
The race has a number of favourites; 2015 Giro Rosa champion Anna van der Breggen and Katarzyna Niewiadoma, reigning World Champion Lizzie Armitstead, Megan Guarnier and World Hour record holder Evelyn Stevens, Emma Pooley, Elisa Longo Borghini and two-time champion Mara Abbott.

Stages

Prologue
1 July 2016 – Gaiarine – Gaiarine,

Stage 1
2 July 2016 – Gaiarine – San Fior,

Stage 2
3 July 2016 – Tarcento – Montenars,

Stage 3
4 July 2016 – Montagnana – Lendinara,

Stage 4
5 July 2016 – Costa Volpino – Lovere,

Stage 5
6 July 2016 – Grosio – Tirano,

Stage 6
7 July 2016 – Andora – Alassio/Madonna della Guardia,

Stage 7
8 July 2016 – Albisola Superiore – Varazze ITT,

Stage 8
9 July 2016 – Rescaldina – Legnano,

Stage 9
10 July 2016 – Verbania – Verbania,

Classification leadership

See also
 2016 in women's road cycling

References

External links

cyclingnews.com
Official site
 2016 Regulations

Giro
Giro d'Italia Femminile
Giro